In American football, a punt is a kick that is performed after a player (most often a punter) drops the ball from their hands and kicks it prior to it hitting the ground. Record keeping for punts in the National Football League (NFL) goes as far back as 1939. 

To be eligible for career-long rankings, a player must have a minimum of 250 punts. After his 22 seasons as an NFL punter, Jeff Feagles retired with 1,713 punts, the NFL's career record. Feagles is the only punter to eclipse 1,500 career punts; a total of 24 players have reached 1,000 punts during their career. Feagles set the career record for total punts while playing for the New York Giants in 2005, when he recorded his 1,368th, surpassing Sean Landeta. With 1,168 punts for the Baltimore Ravens, Sam Koch has the most career punts for any individual franchise. The Kansas City Chiefs and Las Vegas Raiders are the only two franchises with two different players to record 1,000 punts for their teams.

Punting is a strategy in American football designed to put the opposing team at a disadvantage by dealing them poor field position. As such, landing punts close to the receiving team's end zone is highly desired by the punting team. While techniques and strategies (such as the coffin corner punt) are utilized in this context, a punt that enters the end zone can result in a touchback if downed by the receiving team without the ball being advanced beyond their goal line. When a touchback occurs, the ball is placed at the 20-yard line. As such, the ratio of inside-the-20 punts to touchbacks is of consideration. The NFL began officially tracking punts landed inside the 20-yard line and those resulting in touchbacks in 1976. 

Feagles holds the record for punts landing inside opponents' 20-yard line with 554. Shane Lechler holds the record for punting touchbacks with 178.

Career punts leaders

Most punts inside the 20-yard line

Career punting touchbacks leaders

See also
List of National Football League annual punting yards leaders
List of National Football League career punting yards leaders

References

Punting yards leaders
National Football League records and achievements
National Football League lists